Fireball Zone is an album by the American musician Ric Ocasek, released in 1991. The first single was "Rockaway".

Production
The album was produced by Nile Rodgers and Ric Ocasek. Its title is a reference to Thomas Pynchon's Gravity's Rainbow. "Over and Over" and "The Way You Look Tonight" are ballads. In contrast to his Cars days, Ocasek recorded the album live, with his band, rather than part by part.

Critical recpetion

The Ottawa Citizen wrote that "the main thrust of Fireball Zone is to emphasize a funk element within what has always been Ocasek's music style—cold, lean, electronic pop with a tortured bottom end." The Chicago Tribune opined that Fireball Zone "may not be a masterpiece, but it's better than any album by the repetitive Cars, easily one of the most overrated bands of the '80s." The St. Petersburg Times determined that the album finds Ocasek's "rubber-band voice crawling over indistinguishable over-synthesized tunes set to a maddeningly tedious beat."

Tracks
All songs written by Ric Ocasek except where noted.

"Rockaway"
"Touch Down Easy" (Ric Ocasek, Rick Nowels)
"Come Back"
"The Way You Look Tonight"
"All We Need Is Love"
"Over and Over"
"Flowers of Evil"
"They Tried"
"Keep That Dream"
"Balance"
"Mister Meaner"
"Fireball Zone"

Personnel
Ric Ocasek - vocals, guitar, keyboards
Nile Rodgers - guitar
Larry Mitchell - lead guitar
Dann Huff - guitar on "Balance" and "Mister Meaner"
Steve Elson - horns
Stan Harrison - horns
Matt Collehon - horns
Richard Hilton - keyboards
Al Berry - bass guitar
Larry Aberman - drums
Mickey Curry - drums on "Balance" and "Mister Meaner"
Tawatha Agee - backing vocals
Fonzi Thornton - backing vocals
Curtis King Jr. - backing vocals
Dennis Collins - backing vocals
Katherine Miller - engineer
Hiro Ishihara - engineer
Dave Schiffman - engineer
Justin Luchter - engineer
Jon Goldberger - engineer

Charts

References

Ric Ocasek albums
1991 albums
Reprise Records albums
Albums produced by Nile Rodgers
Albums produced by Ric Ocasek